Rheinfelden may refer to:

Places
 Rheinfelden (Baden), a town in the county of Lörrach in Baden-Württemberg, Germany
 Rheinfelden (Aargau), a town in the canton of Aargau, Switzerland
 Rheinfelden District, a district in the Swiss canton of Aargau

People
 Adelaide of Rheinfelden (1060s–1090), Queen Consort of Hungary
 Agnes of Rheinfelden (c. 1065-1111), daughter of King Rudolf of Rheinfelden
 Bertha of Rheinfelden (c. 1065–after 1128), countess of Kellmünz
 Berthold of Rheinfelden or Berthold I, Duke of Swabia (c. 1060-1099), Duke of Swabia
  (1737–1826), German nobleman
 John of Rheinfelden (c. 1340-unknown), Dominican friar and writer 
 Rudolf of Rheinfelden (also Rudolf of Swabia) (c. 1025-1080), counter-king to Henry IV in the Holy Roman Empire

See also
 
 Rheinsfelden, Zurich, Switzerland
 Reinfeld (disambiguation)